This is a list of all cultivars from the reticulatus group of melons, meaning melons that have netting on their skin, which are also known as 'muskmelons'. Varieties are not included on this list. The formal cultivar name of these cultivars will always be Cucumis melo var. reticulatus 'Cultivar Name' (for example: Cucumis melo var. reticulatus 'Anne Arundel').

References 

Lists of cultivars
Melons
Cucumis